Hu Xianqiang (born 1983-03-13 in Qingdao, Shandong) is a male Chinese sports sailor who represented Team China at the 2008 Summer Olympics.

Major performances

2004/2005 National Championships - 2nd/3rd 470 class long distance race;
2005 National Championships - 7th 470 class;
2006 National Championships - 1st 49er class/49er class long distance race

References
 http://2008teamchina.olympic.cn/index.php/personview/personsen/5131

1983 births
Living people
Chinese male sailors (sport)
Olympic sailors of China
Sportspeople from Qingdao
Sailors at the 2008 Summer Olympics – 49er
21st-century Chinese people